Eumetula is a genus of minute sea snails, marine gastropod molluscs in the subfamily Eumetulinae  of the  family Newtoniellidae.

Species
Species in the genus Eumetula include:
 Eumetula albachiarae Cecalupo & Perugia, 2014
 Eumetula aliceae (Dautzenberg & Fischer H., 1896)
 Eumetula arctica (Mörch, 1857)
 Eumetula aureola (Powell, 1933)
 Eumetula axicostulata (Castellanos, Rolán & Bartolotta, 1987)
 Eumetula bia (Bartsch, 1915)
 Eumetula bimarginata (C.B. Adams, 1852)
 Eumetula bouvieri (Dautzenberg & Fischer H., 1896)
 Eumetula brattegardi Høisæter, 2015
 Eumetula dilecta Thiele, 1912
 Eumetula eucosmia Bartsch, 1911
 Eumetula intercalaris (Carpenter, 1865)
 Eumetula macquariensis Tomlin, 1948 
 Eumetula michaelseni (Strebel, 1905)
 †Eumetula mourloni Briart and Cornet 1873 
 Eumetula ornata (Thiele, 1912)
 Eumetula pulla (Philippi, 1845)
 Eumetula strebeli (Thiele, 1912)
 Eumetula striata Gulbin, 1982
 Eumetula vicksburgella MacNeil in MacNeil & Dockery 
 Eumetula vitrea (Dall, 1927)

 Species brought into synonymy 
 Eumetula crystallina (Dall, 1881): synonym of  Varicopeza crystallina (Dall, 1881)
 Eumetula vitrea Tore Høisæter: synonym of Eumetula brattegardi Høisæter, 2015 (invalid: secondary junior homonym of Eumetula vitrea (Dall, 1927); E. brattegardi is a replacement name)

References

 Powell A. W. B., New Zealand Mollusca, William Collins Publishers Ltd, Auckland, New Zealand 1979 
 
 ZipCodeZoo
 Bouchet P. & Warén A. (1993). Revision of the Northeast Atlantic bathyal and abyssal Mesogastropoda. Bollettino Malacologico supplemento 3: 579-840
 Gofas, S.; Le Renard, J.; Bouchet, P. (2001). Mollusca, in: Costello, M.J. et al. (Ed.) (2001). European register of marine species: a check-list of the marine species in Europe and a bibliography of guides to their identification. Collection Patrimoines Naturels, 50: pp. 180–213
 Spencer, H.; Marshall. B. (2009). All Mollusca except Opisthobranchia. In: Gordon, D. (Ed.) (2009). New Zealand Inventory of Biodiversity. Volume One: Kingdom Animalia. 584 pp
 Cecalupo, A., & Perugia, I., 2014. Cerithiopsidae and Newtoniellidae (Gastropoda: Triphoroidea Gray) from French Polynesia area (South Pacific Ocean). Novapex 15(1): 1-22

External links
 Iredale, T. (1918). Molluscan nomenclatural problems and solutions.- No. 1. Proceedings of the Malacological Society of London. 13(1-2): 28-40

Newtoniellidae